The L-ring of the bacterial flagellum is the ring in the lipid outer cell membrane through which the axial filament (rod, hook, and flagellum) passes. that l ring stands for lipopolysaccharide.

References

Bacteria